Andrew Lawrence may refer to:

 Andrew Lawrence (actor) (born 1988), American actor
 Andrew Lawrence (basketball) (born 1990), English basketball player
 Andrew Lawrence (comedian) (born 1979), English former comedian
 Andrew Lawrence (engraver) (1710–1747), English engraver
 Andrew Lawrence (astronomer), (born 1954), British astronomer

See also
 Andrew Lawrence-King (born 1953), Guernsey-born musician